Bouffémont is a commune in the Val-d'Oise department in Île-de-France in northern France.

Geography
The town borders Domont, Moisselles, Baillet-en-France, Chauvry, Saint-Prix and Montlignon.

The city is divided into three districts:

 Hauts-Champs is the district that includes most homes.
 Trait-d'Union is the area between Hauts-Champs and le Village.
 The historic centre of the town is known as le Village.

The city is served by the Bouffémont-Moisselles station, route H of the Transilien Paris-Nord.

Population
In 2017, the commune had a population of 6,327 inhabitants.

See also
Communes of the Val-d'Oise department

References

External links

Official website 
Association of Mayors of the Val d'Oise 

Communes of Val-d'Oise